The following is an episode list for the Australian television series Prank Patrol, a children's television programme on ABC3.

Summary

Series 1

Series 2

Series 3 (Prank Patrol Road Trip)

References

Lists of Australian children's television series episodes